The 2008 Italian general election took place on 13–14 April 2008.

The election was won in Lombardy by the centre-right coalition between The People of Freedom and Lega Nord, as it happened at the national level. The People of Freedom was the largest party in the election with 33.5%, ahead of the Democratic Party (28.1%) and Lega Nord (21.6%).

Results

Chamber of Deputies

|- style="background-color:#E9E9E9"
! rowspan="1" style="text-align:left;vertical-align:top;" |Coalition leaders
! rowspan="1" style="text-align:center;vertical-align:top;" |votes
! rowspan="1" style="text-align:center;vertical-align:top;" |votes (%)
! rowspan="1" style="text-align:center;vertical-align:top;" |seats
! rowspan="1" style="text-align:left;vertical-align:top;" |Party
! rowspan="1" style="text-align:center;vertical-align:top;" |votes
! rowspan="1" style="text-align:center;vertical-align:top;" |votes (%)
! rowspan="1" style="text-align:center;vertical-align:top;" |seats
|-
! rowspan="2" style="text-align:left;vertical-align:top;" |Silvio Berlusconi
| rowspan="2" style="vertical-align:top;" |3,387,180
| rowspan="2" style="vertical-align:top;" |55.1
| rowspan="2" style="vertical-align:top;" |62

| style="text-align:left;" |The People of Freedom
| style="vertical-align:top;" |2,059,231
| style="vertical-align:top;" |33.5
| style="vertical-align:top;" |37
|-
| style="text-align:left;" |Lega Nord
| style="vertical-align:top;" |1,327,949
| style="vertical-align:top;" |21.6
| style="vertical-align:top;" |25

|-
! rowspan="2" style="text-align:left;vertical-align:top;" |Walter Veltroni
| rowspan="2" style="vertical-align:top;" |1,972,981
| rowspan="2" style="vertical-align:top;" |32.1
| rowspan="2" style="vertical-align:top;" |32

| style="text-align:left;" |Democratic Party
| style="vertical-align:top;" |1,727,006
| style="vertical-align:top;" |28.1
| style="vertical-align:top;" |28
|-
| style="text-align:left;" |Italy of Values
| style="vertical-align:top;" |245,975
| style="vertical-align:top;" |4.0
| style="vertical-align:top;" |4

|-
! rowspan="1" style="text-align:left;vertical-align:top;" |Pier Ferdinando Casini
| rowspan="1" style="vertical-align:top;" |261,293
| rowspan="1" style="vertical-align:top;" |4.3
| rowspan="1" style="vertical-align:top;" |5

| style="text-align:left;" |Union of the Centre
| style="vertical-align:top;" |261,293
| style="vertical-align:top;" |4.3
| style="vertical-align:top;" |5

|-
! rowspan="1" style="text-align:left;vertical-align:top;" |Fausto Bertinotti
| rowspan="1" style="vertical-align:top;" |180,621
| rowspan="1" style="vertical-align:top;" |2.9
| rowspan="1" style="vertical-align:top;" |-

| style="text-align:left;" |The Left – The Rainbow
| style="vertical-align:top;" |180,621
| style="vertical-align:top;" |2.9
| style="vertical-align:top;" |-

|-
! rowspan="1" style="text-align:left;vertical-align:top;" |Daniela Santanchè
| rowspan="1" style="vertical-align:top;" |130,324
| rowspan="1" style="vertical-align:top;" |2.1
| rowspan="1" style="vertical-align:top;" |-

| style="text-align:left;" |The Right
| style="vertical-align:top;" |130,324
| style="vertical-align:top;" |2.1
| style="vertical-align:top;" |-

|-
! rowspan="1" style="text-align:left;vertical-align:top;" |Enrico Boselli
| rowspan="1" style="vertical-align:top;" |37,349
| rowspan="1" style="vertical-align:top;" |0.6
| rowspan="1" style="vertical-align:top;" |-

| style="text-align:left;" |Socialist Party
| style="vertical-align:top;" |37,349
| style="vertical-align:top;" |0.6
| style="vertical-align:top;" |-

|-
! rowspan="1" style="text-align:left;vertical-align:top;" |Marco Ferrando
| rowspan="1" style="vertical-align:top;" |33,646
| rowspan="1" style="vertical-align:top;" |0.5
| rowspan="1" style="vertical-align:top;" |-

| style="text-align:left;" |Workers' Communist Party
| style="vertical-align:top;" |33,646
| style="vertical-align:top;" |0.5
| style="vertical-align:top;" |-

|-
! rowspan="1" style="text-align:left;vertical-align:top;" |Giuliano Ferrara
| rowspan="1" style="vertical-align:top;" |28,439
| rowspan="1" style="vertical-align:top;" |0.5
| rowspan="1" style="vertical-align:top;" |-

| style="text-align:left;" |Abortion? No, thanks
| style="vertical-align:top;" |28,439
| style="vertical-align:top;" |0.5
| style="vertical-align:top;" |-

|-
! rowspan="1" style="text-align:left;vertical-align:top;" |Others
| rowspan="1" style="vertical-align:top;" |110,214
| rowspan="1" style="vertical-align:top;" |1.8
| rowspan="1" style="vertical-align:top;" |-

| style="text-align:left;" |Others
| style="vertical-align:top;" |110,214
| style="vertical-align:top;" |1.8
| style="vertical-align:top;" |-

|-
|- style="background-color:#E9E9E9"
! rowspan="1" style="text-align:left;vertical-align:top;" |Total coalitions
! rowspan="1" style="text-align:right;vertical-align:top;" |6,142,028
! rowspan="1" style="text-align:right;vertical-align:top;" |100.0
! rowspan="1" style="text-align:right;vertical-align:top;" |98
! rowspan="1" style="text-align:left;vertical-align:top;" |Total parties
! rowspan="1" style="text-align:right;vertical-align:top;" |6,142,028
! rowspan="1" style="text-align:right;vertical-align:top;" |100.0
! rowspan="1" style="text-align:right;vertical-align:top;" |98

Source: Ministry of the Interior

Senate

MPs elected in Lombardy

Chamber of Deputies

Lombardy 1 (Milano-Monza)

The People of Freedom
Ignazio La Russa
Stefania Craxi
Gianfranco Rotondi
Andrea Ronchi
Mario Valducci
Paolo Romani
Maurizio Lupi
Luigi Casero
Francesco Colucci
Gaetano Pecorella
Paola Frassinetti
Valentina Aprea
Mariella Bocciardo
Elena Centemero
Riccardo De Corato
Giorgio Stracquadanio

Democratic Party
Matteo Colaninno
Linda Lanzillotta
Barbara Pollastrini
Emilio Quartiani
Enrico Farinone
Furio Colombo
Emilia De Biasi
Emanuele Fiano
Vinicio Peluffo
Alessia Mosca
Roberto Zaccaria
Lino Duilio
Pierluigi Mantini

Lega Nord
Umberto Bossi
Giancarlo Giorgetti
Ettore Pirovano (replaced by Fabio Meroni on 21 December 2011)
Paolo Grimoldi
Matteo Salvini (replaced by Marco Desiderati on 13 July 2009)
Giacomo Chiappori
Claudio D'Amico
Laura Molteni

Italy of Values
Gabriele Cimadoro
Anita Di Giuseppe

Union of the Centre
Bruno Tabacci

Lombardy 2 (Bergamo-Brescia-Como-Sondrio-Varese-Lecco)

The People of Freedom
Giulio Tremonti
Mariastella Gelmini
Raffaello Vignali
Mirko Tremaglia (replaced by Luigi Fabbri on 10 January 2012)
Gregorio Fontana
Stefano Saglia
Antonio Palmieri
Adriano Paroli (replaced by Marco Airaghi on 1 February 2012)
Laura Ravetto
Viviana Beccalossi
Giuseppe Romele
Giorgio Jannone
Massimo Maria Berruti
Antonio Angelucci
Renato Farina

Lega Nord
Roberto Maroni
Giacomo Stucchi
Davide Caparini
Marco Reguzzoni
Daniele Molgora
Nicola Molteni
Marco Rondini
Carolina Lussana
Silvana Comaroli
Jonny Crosio
Pierguido Vanalli
Erica Rivolta
Raffaele Volpi
Nunziante Consiglio

Democratic Party
Enrico Letta
Paolo Corsini
Paola Binetti
Antonio Misiani
Daniele Marantelli
Giovanni Sanga
Lucia Codurelli
Renzo Lusetti
Pierangelo Ferrari
Chiara Braga

Union of the Centre
Savino Pezzotta
Luca Volontè

Italy of Values
Sergio Piffari
Ivan Rota

Lombardy 3 (Cremona-Mantova-Pavia-Lodi)

The People of Freedom
Gian Carlo Abelli
Massimo Corsaro
Maurizio Bernardo
Chiara Moroni
Andrea Orsini
Carlo Nola

Democratic Party
Antonello Soro
Luciano Pizzetti
Maurizio Turco
Angelo Zucchi
Marco Carra

Lega Nord
Andrea Gibelli (replaced by Marco Maggioni on 18 May 2010)
Giovanni Fava
Alberto Torazzi

Union of the Centre
Anna Formisano (replaced by Pietro Marcazzan on 16 September 2010)

Senate

The People of Freedom

Roberto Formigoni (replaced by Riccardo Conti on 4 June 2008)
Alfredo Mantica
Ombretta Colli
Guido Possa
Alessio Butti
Giampiero Cantoni
Marcello Dell'Utri
Mario Mantovani
Romano Comincioli (replaced by Antonio Del Pennino on 21 June 2011)
Antonino Caruso
Luigi Scotti (replaced by Alessandra Gallone on 9 December 2008)
Antonio Tomassini
Giancarlo Serafini
Giuseppe Valditara
Giacomo Caliendo
Salvatore Sciascia
Valerio Carrara
Alfredo Messina
Pierfrancesco Gamba

Democratic Party

Umberto Veronesi (replaced by Francesco Monaco on 23 February 2011)
Mauro Ceruti
Pietro Ichino
Emanuela Baio
Gerardo D'Ambrosio
Daniele Bosone
Fiorenza Bassoli
Tiziano Treu
Luigi Vimercati
Antonio Rusconi
Guido Galperti
Cinzia Fontana
Giorgio Roilo
Paolo Rossi
Marilena Adamo

Lega Nord

Roberto Calderoli
Giuseppe Leoni
Rosi Mauro
Massimo Garavaglia
Cesarino Monti
Roberto Mura
Sandro Mazzatorta
Lorenzo Bodega
Fabio Rizzi
Armando Valli
Irene Aderenti

Italy of Values

Giuliana Carlino
Giuseppe Astore

References 

Elections in Lombardy